Bob Miller was a professional baseball second baseman who played in the Negro leagues in the 1920s and 1930s.

Miller made his professional debut in 1923 with the Birmingham Black Barons. He played several seasons with the Memphis Red Sox, and finished his career in 1932 with the Nashville Elite Giants and the Louisville Black Caps.

References

External links
 and Baseball-Reference Black Baseball stats and Seamheads

Place of birth missing
Place of death missing
Year of birth missing
Year of death missing
Birmingham Black Barons players
Louisville Black Caps players
Memphis Red Sox players
Nashville Elite Giants players